Hluboš is a municipality and village in Příbram District in the Central Bohemian Region of the Czech Republic. It has about 600 inhabitants.

Administrative parts

The village of Kardavec is an administrative part of Hluboš.

Geography
It is situated on the right bank of the Litavka river. It lies in the Brdy Highlands.

History
The first written mention of Hluboš is from 1355. A wooden fortress was located here. The owners of Hluboš often changed and belonged to the lower nobility. In 1546, Petr Vamberský had rebuilt the fortress into a castle.

Sights
The Hluboš Castle was rebuilt into the late Baroque form in the 18th century. In 1872, it was reconstructed and extended by the family of Oettingen-Wallerstein. The result of these modifications is the present appearance of the castle with many pseudo-Renaissance elements. In 1920 and 1921 it served as a summer residence of Czechoslovak president T. G. Masaryk.

The botanical garden at Hluboš Castle is one of the oldest in Central Europe. Through the Hluboš park, some trees from America and China appeared in the Czech Republic for the very first time. These were, for example, Ginkgo biloba, Cedrus libani, Juniperus virginiana, Tsuga canadensis, Thuja or Taxus.

Today the castle complex is privately owned and partially open to the public under certain conditions.

References

External links

Villages in Příbram District